A Lyot filter, named for its inventor Bernard Lyot, is a type of optical filter that uses birefringence to produce a narrow passband of transmitted wavelengths. Lyot filters are often used in astronomy, particularly for solar astronomy.

A Lyot filter is made from one or more birefringent plates (usually quartz), with (in multi-plate filters) each plate being half the thickness of the previous one. Because the plates are birefringent, the ordinary and extraordinary polarization components of a light beam experience a different refractive index and thus have a different phase velocity. Therefore, the polarization state of light with an arbitrary wavelength will in general be modified after a passage through the filter plate, and this causes a loss of optical power in a subsequent polarizer. For certain wavelengths, however, the optical path length difference is an integer multiple of the wavelength, so that the losses are very small. By rotating the plates, one can shift the wavelengths of the transmission peaks.  

Each stage of a Lyot filter is 1/2 the size of the preceding stage. The largest stage sets the bandwidth and the smallest stage sets the Free Spectral Range. If two of the second largest crystals are used the contrast of the desired line increases, and if the crystals are split in half and a 1/2 waveplate is placed in the center the field of view of the filter increases. The separation and narrowness of the transmission peaks depends on the number, thicknesses, and orientation of the plates.

If electrically tunable birefringent elements are inserted (liquid crystal or electrooptic), then an "Electrically Tunable Lyot Filter" is obtained. Liquid crystal tunable filters allow analogue tuning of the transmitted wavelength by carefully adjusting the voltage over the liquid crystal cells. Often these filters are based on the original Lyot design, but many other designs exist in order to achieve either narrow or broad band transmission, polarization selectivity, etc.

Single and multi-plate Lyot filters are often used inside the optical cavity of lasers to allow tuning of the laser. In this case, Brewster losses from the plate and other intracavity elements are usually sufficient to produce the polarizing effect and no additional polarizers are required.  Although their mechanisms are different, modelocking lasers and Lyot-filter lasers both produce a comb of multiple wavelengths which can be placed on the ITU channel grid for Dense Wave Division Multiplexing (DWDM) or used to give each suburban home its own return-signal laser wavelength in a passive optical network (PON) used to provide FTTH (Fiber To The Home).

See also
 Lyot stop
 Lyot depolarizer
 Liquid crystal tunable filter

References

Optical filters